Luis Antonio Liendo Asbún (born February 25, 1978 in La Serena) is a retired Chilean-Bolivian football midfielder, who has played in different leagues throughout South America, Europe and North America. He also played for the Bolivia national team.

Club career
Liendo began his soccer career in 1997 playing for the Boca Juniors reserves team in Argentina then was signed by Bolívar in Bolivia.

Liendo had a brief experience with Real Madrid B in Spain. Shortly after his time in Spain, he was bought by Ascoli in Italy. He also played for Spezia, Novara and Gela in Italy.

After six years of playing in Italy, Liendo relocated to North America where he played for the USL1 team, Atlanta Silverbacks in 2007. After a couple of seasons in the United States, Liendo returned to Bolivia and signed with La Paz F.C. Towards the end of his career he also played for Universitario de Sucre and Sport Boys Warnes.

International career
Liendo earned 6 caps for the Bolivia national team and was called up by his country for several FIFA World Cup qualification matches, but did not make any appearance

Personal life
Liendo's father, also Luis (born April 1946), played in Argentina, Bolivia and Chile during the 70's and 80's and also played for the Bolivia national team.

References

External links
 
 
 
 Luis Liendo at HistoriadeBoca.com.ar 
 Futbolista Bolivia profile
 Article at La Prensa
 rsssf.com Copa America 1999 (rsssf.com)
Wikilink: Nike Cup Link 1999 Nike U.S. Cup
Wikilink: Footballers :Category:Chilean footballers
Wikipedia article in Spanish :es:Luis Liendo
 Copa Nissan Sudamericana 2009
 Futbolista Bolivia Blog
Team Website:  https://web.archive.org/web/20050125131922/http://lapazfutbolclub.com/

1978 births
Living people
People from La Serena
Chilean people of Bolivian descent
Chilean people of Argentine descent
Bolivian people of Argentine descent
Association football midfielders
Chilean footballers
Chilean expatriate footballers
Naturalized citizens of Bolivia
Bolivian footballers
Bolivian expatriate footballers
Bolivia international footballers
Club Bolívar players
The Strongest players
Spezia Calcio players
Novara F.C. players
Ascoli Calcio 1898 F.C. players
S.S.D. Città di Gela players
Atlanta Silverbacks players
La Paz F.C. players
Universitario de Sucre footballers
Expatriate footballers in Argentina
Chilean expatriate sportspeople in Argentina
Bolivian expatriate sportspeople in Argentina
Expatriate footballers in Italy
Bolivian expatriate sportspeople in Italy
Expatriate soccer players in the United States
Bolivian expatriate sportspeople in the United States
1999 Copa América players
USL First Division players